The Ehvam - International Spiritual Center for Peace also known as the Arava Spiritual Center, which is located in the southern Arava region in Israel, is a non-profit, non-governmental, and non-political organization founded in 2007 by Dvora Tzvieli. It is funded by donations through the "Shita Vechochma" (Method & Wisdom) NPO.

History 
The Ehvam - International Spiritual Center for Peace was established in 2007 by Dvora Tzvieli, known to her students as Lama Dvora-Hella, a student of Lama Sermey Rinpoche Geshe Lobsang Tarchin, whom she met in 1998. Tzvieli, a veteran of the Diamond Mountain Retreat Center in Phoenix Arizona where she spent 3 years in solitary retreat in the late 2000s, has devoted her life to the study, teaching and practice of Buddhism and traditions of the Far East.

Goal
The main focus in the establishment of the center was to act towards sustainable peace in the Middle East and thus contribute to World Peace.

The meaning of Ehvam 
The name "Ehvam" is composed of two Sanskrit syllables and has a deep symbolic meaning in the Buddhist tradition. Amongst other things it conveys the ultimate enlightened state of complete freedom, purity, and wisdom. It also conveys the inseparability of a pure and peaceful world with peace and purity in the hearts of its inhabitants and the attainment of inner purity and peace which is ultimately reflected in the environment around us.

Activities 
The center facilitates study programs on the topic of Buddhism, Yoga and Meditation courses and workshops, workshops led by both local and guest speakers, retreats, joint activities between Israeli Jews, Arabs, Palestinians and people from around the world.

In 2019, the center hosted Lama Gyume Khensur Rinpoche Lobsang Jampa, a Lama globally-known for his Buddhist teachings. That same year, the center hosted world-renowned meditation researcher B. Alan Wallace.

On January 8, 2021, the center initiated a year-long silent retreat workshop which will conclude in January 2022. During this silent retreat, participants are completely devoid of any communication with the outside world. This workshop is thought to be the first of its kind conducted in Israel.

Controversy 
A report published in Haaretz highlighted criticisms, made by at least ten past students and students' family members, of the unconventional methods endorsed in the center. Those include the unreserved loyalty demanded by Tzvieli, services students felt expected to provide to the teacher, such as feeding, cleaning, massage, and monetary donations, and a practice of boycotting students who decided to leave. Some students turned to the Israeli Center for Cult Victims after a period in the center. The report described an incident in which a student's marriage nearly terminated following an episode of "tantric relationship" with Tzvieli.

Further reading 
 Buddhism
 Yoga
 Meditation

External links 
 
 Method & Wisdom NPO website
 Arava Spiritual Center

References 

Organizations established in 2007
Spiritual retreats
Non-profit organizations based in Israel
Buddhism in Israel
Yoga organizations
Spiritual organizations
Community-building organizations
Peace organizations